The Slave is a 1918 British silent crime film directed by Arrigo Bocchi and starring Jean-Marie de l'Isle, Hayford Hobbs and Charles Vane. It was based on the 1899 novel of the same name by Robert Hichens.

Plot summary

Cast
 Jean-Marie de l'Isle as Lady Carroll Knox  
 Hayford Hobbs as Aubrey Herrick 
 Charles Vane as Sir Reuben Allabruth  
 Hettie Grossman as Diamond Manners 
 Ernest Wallace 
 Paul Courtenay

References

Bibliography
 Goble, Alan. The Complete Index to Literary Sources in Film. Walter de Gruyter, 1999.

External links
 

1918 films
British silent feature films
British crime drama films
1910s English-language films
Films directed by Arrigo Bocchi
British black-and-white films
1918 crime drama films
Films based on British novels
1910s British films
Silent crime drama films